Fairford was built by John Barnard at Barnard's Wharf in Rotherhithe and launched in January 1782. Captain John Haldane sailed from Gravesend on 2 May, bound for India. He stopped at Portsmouth where he waited for thee months. Fairford reached Bombay. She was loading cargo for England when she caught fire there on 15 June 1783. She was entirely consumed, but her crew was saved.

The Governor of the Bombay Presidency, William Hornby, gave Haldane command of the packet . Nancy was lost off the Isles of Scilly on 9 February 1784, or 24 February. Among those drowned were actress Ann Cargill and her young child; Cargill was Haldane's lover or wife.

Citations and references
Citations

References
 
 
 

1782 ships
Age of Sail merchant ships of England
ships of the British East India Company
Maritime incidents in 1783